Schwarzer Samt (English: Black Velvet) is a German crime film from Heinz Thiel produced by the DEFA in the year 1964.

Plot summary 
The State Security Service detains the photographer Gwendoleit, who as courier was supposed to bring counterfeited documents and numberplates to Leipzig and moreover to get active there as photographer. Because the State Security Service neither knows, with whom Gwendoleit wants to meet in Leipzig, nor what the photo subject was, the security agent Alexander Berg takes up the identity of Gwendoleit, although he actually planned tripping to Oberhof for winter holidays.

In Leipzig Helma Sibelka appears and hands over a deposit for the passports and the numberplates to Alexander. Berg refuses the delivery of the passports, that she only will get when the full amount is paid. Helma visits her husband, the engineer Manfred, in the guesthouse, where she finds him with the secretary Vera Gorm. For Manfred the marriage is going to break down, for a long time he is planning his coup without his wife.

Alexander, who takes his position in the Hotel Astoria, does only have a few clues, what the affair is about. In a few days the Leipzig Trade Fair will start. Beside that he gets an encrypted letter, in that he is asked by a "Dora" to remind his "business partner" of a delivery "black velvet". Soon it is clear that a certain doctor Oranke is hiding behind "Dora". "Black velvet" is identified by the security agents with the demanded "snap shot" Manfred is speaking at a meeting. Actually Manfred demands Alexander soon to take the snap shot - from his working room, from where a blind controlled crane can be seen, which will be the sensation on the Leipzig Trade Fair. Crane operator Manfred manipulates the machine, so that the monitors break down and the test run becomes a disaster. Alexander films this with his camera. Soon the connections are getting clear: Manfred was offered a position by doctor Oranke, who was living in Hamburg. But previously he is supposed to damage sustainably his company and the economical prestige of the GDR by the enhanced attention in the context of the trade fair. The security agents want nevertheless play for time to find out, who Manfred wants to take with him on the second demanded passport, because it will not be his wife. Soon after Alexander discovers Manfred battered to death.

He is requested by an unknown person to come to Manfred's office. Here he meets Vera Gorm, who in reality is one of the masterminds of the operation. She reveals to Alexander that Manfred actually should handle the crane with acid, so it had to collapse at the trade fair opening day, but he was going to duck out. She had to kill him. The acid however was transported in a box with the inscription "black velvet". Alexander makes himself suspicious, because he doesn't know certain facts, and is exposed by Vera. By an accomplice she let him bring to the cellar rooms of the building, while she is going to destroy the crane with acid. Here she is detained by Alexander's men and also Alexander, who was able to take out the accomplice, appears. The case is solved.

Soon after Alexander is already sitting in the train to Oberhof. A female fellow passenger is spraying on perfume - with the brand "black velvet".

Production 

Schwarzer Samt was shot in 1963 in and around Leipzig. Filming locations include the Hotel Astoria, where Alexander Berg lived during his investigations, and the Monument to the Battle of the Nations, where the scene of the gathering of Alexander and Manfred emerged.

On 27 February 1964 the film premiered at Kino Babylon in Berlin. The script is based on themes of the novel Der scharlachrote Domino (The Scarlet Red Domino) by Fred Unger.

Cast 
 Erich Gerberding: Captain Jensen
 Rudolf Ulrich: Lieutenant Wohlfahrt
 Fred Delmare: Alexander Berg
 Günther Simon: Manfred Sibelka
 Christa Gottschalk: Helma Sibelka
 Christine Laszar: Vera Gorm
 Herbert Köfer: Doctor Kosel
 Christoph Engel: Pitt Steffens
 Vera Oelschlegel: Karin Sommer
 Hans Lucke: Stasi staff
 Manfred Zetzsche: Stasi staff
 Rolf Ripperger: Stasi staff
 Trude Bechmann: Misses Igelfink
 Georg-Michael Wagner: Gwendoleit
 Winfried Wagner: Archenbeau
 Werner Godemann: Monument janitor
 Hans Maikowski: Hartwig
 Sigmar Schramm: Schrön
 Ernst Balke: police councillor
 Klaus Fiedler: hotel boy

Critical reviews 
Contemporary critics gave negative ratings for the film. "In favour of external tension sometimes internal logic is lacking; with an overly complicated setup of their plans the agents seem to put obstacles in their own way", a critic judged. Renate Holland-Moritz criticized, that in the film yet another time "a superman is served, who solves the difficult case almost in solo action."

film-dienst states Schwarzer Samt to be "exciting entertainment, that satirizes the James Bond mythos within the limits of possibilities."

Literature 
 Schwarzer Samt. In: Frank-Burkhard Habel: Das große Lexikon der DEFA-Spielfilme. Schwarzkopf & Schwarzkopf, Berlin 2000, pg. 523–524.

References

External links 
 
 Black Velvet at the DEFA Film Library

1964 films
East German films
1960s German-language films
German crime films
1964 crime films
German black-and-white films
Films based on German novels
Mass media in Leipzig
1960s German films